Reuben Broadbent (December 23, 1817 in Kexby, Lincolnshire, England – May 20, 1909) was a pioneer architect in Utah and a member of the Church of Jesus Christ of Latter-day Saints (LDS Church).

History
Raised Episcopalian, he learned carpentry from his father. After converting to the LDS Church in 1849, he emigrated to America with his wife Harriet Otter on the 1851 ship Ellen. He lived in St. Louis, Missouri for some time before settling in Farmington, Utah.

Among his works are the Farmington Rock Chapel and the Bowman-Chamberlain House which are listed on the U.S. National Register of Historic Places.

See also
 Reuben Broadbent at Findagrave.com

References

1817 births
1909 deaths
Converts to Mormonism from Anglicanism
English emigrants to the United States
English Latter Day Saints
19th-century American architects
Architects from Utah
Architects of Latter Day Saint religious buildings and structures
People from West Lindsey District
Former Anglicans